Lodge is an unincorporated community in the western part of Lorance Township in Bollinger County, Missouri, United States.
     
A post office was in service between 1880–1942.

References 

Unincorporated communities in Bollinger County, Missouri
Cape Girardeau–Jackson metropolitan area
Unincorporated communities in Missouri